Ponzetti is an Italian surname. Notable people with the surname include:

Ferdinando Ponzetti (1444–1527), Italian Roman Catholic bishop and cardinal
Giacomo Ponzetti, 16th-century Italian Roman Catholic bishop

 Italian-language surnames